The Lakefield Chiefs are a Canadian Junior ice hockey team based in Lakefield, Ontario, Canada.  They played in the Central Ontario Junior C Hockey League of the Ontario Hockey Association until the 2016-17 season when this league became the Orr Division of the Provincial Junior Hockey League

History

The Lakefield Chiefs emerged in the late 1970s as members of the Eastern Junior D Hockey League.

In the 1977-78 season, the Chiefs were Eastern league champions and faced off against the Western Ontario Junior D Hockey League Champions the Exeter Hawks.  In a long and tight series, the Chiefs won game 7 and the series 4-games-to-3 to win their first OHA Cup as provincial champions.

A year later, the Chiefs were again the Eastern league champions.   The Chiefs defeated the Western Ontario league's St. George Dukes 4-games-to-2 to clinch their second straight OHA Cup as Ontario Junior "D" Champions.

In 1980, the Lakefield Chiefs were promoted to join the Central Lakeshore Junior C Hockey League.  Around 1986, the league merged with the Quinte-St. Lawrence Junior C Hockey League and became the Central Ontario Junior C Hockey League.  That same year, the Chiefs won the Central Lakeshore championship.

In 1987, the Chiefs won the Central Ontario league championship.  They moved on to the provincial championships and found themselves in the Clarence Schmalz Cup final against the Niagara & District Junior C Hockey League's Norwich Merchants.  The Chiefs came out victorious, winning the series 4-games-to-2 to win their first Clarence Schmalz Cup.

Over the next eleven seasons, the Chiefs won three league titles.  They won in 1989, 1997, and 1999.  In 2000, the Lakefield Chiefs won their third league championship in four years.  This year was different.  They pushed deep into provincial playdowns and found themselves again in the Clarence Schmalz Cup finals.  Their opponent ended up being the Great Lakes Junior C Hockey League's Belle River Canadiens.  The Chiefs defeated them to win their second All-Ontario title at the Junior "C" level 4-games-to-2.

The Chiefs won their league again in 2004.

In 2005-06, the Chiefs finished the season in fourth place.  In the league quarter-final, the Chiefs defeated the Georgina Ice 3-games-to-none.  In the league semi-final, the Chiefs ran into the top seeded Port Perry Mojacks.  The Mojacks defeated the Chiefs 4-games-to-1 to move on to the league final.

The 2006-07 season, the Chiefs won the regular season crown to earn the top seed in the playoffs.  In the league semi-final, the Chiefs played against the Uxbridge Bruins and swept them 4-games-to-none.  In the league final, the Chiefs also swept the Port Perry Mojacks 4-games-to-none to win the league championship.  They moved on to the provincial quarter-finals where they were pitted against the Empire B Junior C Hockey League's Amherstview Jets.  The Chiefs beat the Jets 4-games-to-2 to advance further.  In the provincial semi-final, the Chiefs ran into the Georgian Mid-Ontario Junior C Hockey League's Penetang Kings.  The Chiefs were swept 4-games-to-none by the Kings.

Season-by-season results

Schmalz Cup Finals appearances
1987: Lakefield Chiefs defeated Norwich Merchants 4-games-to-2
2000: Lakefield Chiefs defeated Belle River Canadiens 4-games-to-2
2014: Lakefield Chiefs defeated Essex 73's 4-games-to-none
2018: Lakefield Chiefs defeated Glanbrook Rangers 4-games-to-1

OHA Cup Finals appearances
1978: Lakefield Chiefs defeated Exeter Hawks 4-games-to-3
1979: Lakefield Chiefs defeated St. George Dukes 4-games-to-2

2017–18 Team Staff
President - Don Dunford
General Manager - Tyler Revoy
Head Coach - Jamie Arcand
Assistant Coach - Shawn Dunbar
Assistant Coach - Jason Hinze 
Assistant Coach - Nick O'Brien
Trainer - Blair Nelson / Jared Ellis

Notable alumni
Kevin Evans
Sean Hill

External links
Chiefs' OHA Webpage
PJHL Website

Ice hockey teams in Ontario